It's in the Air may refer to:
 It's in the Air (1938 film), a British comedy film
 It's in the Air (1935 film), an American comedy film
 It's in the Air (horse), an American Thoroughbred racehorse